Fingig is a small town in the commune of Käerjeng, in western Luxembourg.  , the town has a population of 322.  Nearby is the source of the Eisch.

External links

Käerjeng
Towns in Luxembourg